Ambrogio Preda (Milan, December 25, 1839 -  Davesco Soragno, Lugano, June 5, 1906) was an Italian painter, mainly of landscapes of the alpine mountains and valleys.

Born in Lombardy, he studied at the Brera Academy, and was a resident of Milan and Lugano. In 1860, he won a Mylius prize at the Brera Academy.  He painted impressions of alpine landscapes including Ottobre, exhibited at Turin in 1884, Lago di Lugano, exhibited at Milan in 1881; Davesio exhibited at Turin in 1880; and a Veduta nella Svizzera Italiana exhibited at Milan, in 1872. He should not be confused with the Milanese Renaissance painter Giovanni Ambrogio de Predis.

References

1839 births
1906 deaths
19th-century Italian painters
Italian male painters
20th-century Italian painters
Italian landscape painters
Painters from Milan
Brera Academy alumni
19th-century Italian male artists
20th-century Italian male artists